They Made Me a Criminal is a 1939 American crime drama film directed by Busby Berkeley and starring John Garfield, Claude Rains, and The Dead End Kids. It is a remake of the film The Life of Jimmy Dolan (1933). The film was later featured in an episode of Cinema Insomnia. Portions of the film were shot in the Coachella Valley, California.

Plot 
Johnnie Bradfield is a southpaw world champion boxer falsely accused of murder. He disappears and is presumed dead. The only witnesses who could have exonerated him were his manager and girlfriend, both of whom have died in an automobile accident. Detective Monty Phelan believes that Johnnie is still alive and hasn't given up on searching for him. Johnnie, meanwhile, is hiding out on Grandma Rafferty's farm in Arizona. There, he meets up with some juvenile delinquents, Tommy, Angel, Spit, Dippy, T.B., and Milty, who are under the guardianship of Tommy's sister Peggy.

Johnnie, using the fake name of Jack Dorney, takes Tommy under his wing and encourages him to go in business for himself by buying a gas pump for the farm. He helps the kids raise money by returning to the boxing ring for a match against an up-and-coming boxer. Johnnie sees Phelan arriving at the fight and decides not to fight, disappointing the kids and Peggy. However his determination to help the kids overcomes him and he decides to fight. He tries to hide who he really is by not using his trademark stance in the ring, but not being a good right handed fighter, he is on the verge of losing. Because of this, Johnnie reveals who he really is, although he is still defeated in the fifth round. He surrenders to Phelan assuming he will be arrested, but the detective allows him to remain in Arizona instead of returning to New York.

Cast

Main cast
 John Garfield as Johnnie Bradfield
 Claude Rains as Det. Monty Phelan
 Ann Sheridan as Goldie West
 Barbara Pepper as Budgie
 May Robson as Grandma Rafferty
 Gloria Dickson as Peggy
 Ward Bond as Lenihan
 William B. Davidson as the Chief of Detectives
 Robert Gleckler as Doc Ward

The Dead End Kids
 Billy Halop as Tommy
 Bobby Jordan as Angel
 Leo Gorcey as Spit
 Gabriel Dell as T.B.
 Huntz Hall as Dippy
 Bernard Punsley as Milt

References to other films 
When Dippy is operating the shower controls for Jack, who is showering, he serenades him with the song, By a Waterfall, which was a hit song from the director's earlier film, Footlight Parade.

Malaprop 
This film also contains the first malapropism of the Dead End Kids/East Side Kids/Bowery Boys series when Jordan says Regenerate, ya dope when Hall used the word degenerate. Malapropisms became a staple of these films, with Gorcey using them on a regular basis throughout the series.

Home media 
As this film is in the public domain, there have been several DVD releases from a variety of companies over the years. The Alpha Video DVD was released on July 30, 2002.

References

External links 
 
 
 
 
 

1939 films
1939 crime drama films
American crime drama films
American black-and-white films
Remakes of American films
Films shot in California
Warner Bros. films
Films directed by Busby Berkeley
Films produced by Hal B. Wallis
Films scored by Max Steiner
1930s English-language films
1930s American films